Eco Park may refer to:

Eco Park (stadium), a stadium in Gloucestershire, England.
Eco Park, Kolkata in Rajarhat, Kolkata, India
Eco Park, Patna in Bihar, India
Royal National City Park in Sweden
Tilagor Eco Park in the Sylhet district, Bangladesh

See also
EcoPark (disambiguation)
Eco-industrial park